The Negro River is a river in Saint Mary Parish, Jamaica, that joins the River Otram at Trinity before reaching the sea at the parish capital of Port Maria.

See also
List of rivers of Jamaica
Paggee River

References

Rivers of Jamaica
Geography of Saint Mary Parish, Jamaica